The Nakba Law is an Israeli law.

Background 
The Nakba Law was first proposed in 2008 by Alex Miller. The proposal was preliminarily approved by the Ministerial Committee for Legislation on May 24, 2009. The proposal was rejected and sent to the Committee for Constitution, Law, and Justice for revision.

Thirty-seven members of the Knesset voted in favor of the Nakba Law, and twenty-five voted against, but sixty out of 120 MKs did not show up for the vote, including Prime Minister Benjamin Netanyahu.

Provisions 
The law authorises the Ministry of Finance to impose financial penalties on any organisation or body that commemorates Israeli Independence Day as a day of mourning and withdraw their funding or support from the state.

Effects 
In 2019, Tel Aviv University cancelled a lecture by Ofer Cassif citing the law.

References

Citations

Bibliography 

  
  

2011 in Israeli politics
Anti-Palestinian sentiment in Israel
Israeli laws
History of the Palestinian refugees